Tamil primary schools in Malaysia are Malaysian government-aided primary schools that use the Tamil language as the medium of instruction. They are primarily attended by Malaysian Indians of Tamil descent.

Within the framework of the Malaysian educational system, Tamil primary schools are referred to as "National-type (Tamil) Schools" (Malay: Sekolah Jenis Kebangsaan (Tamil)). As with other government schools, they follow the unified national curriculum, with the teaching of the Malay and English languages as compulsory subjects. All other subjects are taught in Tamil, except Science and Mathematics which are in either Tamil or English depending on the school and school grade. There are six year-long school grades, referred to as Year 1 to 6. Typically, students enter Year 1 at age six, in the calendar year they turn seven. In Year 6, students sit for a standardised test called Ujian Pencapaian Sekolah Rendah (UPSR, Primary School Assessment Test). After completing their studies in Tamil primary schools, most students continue studying at national secondary schools which uses Malay as medium of instruction.

Besides providing education in the Tamil language, the schools also play a part in imparting Indian cultural and religious values to young Malaysian Indians to maintain a distinct Indian identity while fostering national unity in multiethnic Malaysia. Currently there are 523 Tamil primary schools in Malaysia. Tamil school in Malaysia was formed by an Tamilar association in Malaysia and it was established first as Saraswathy Tamil school in Old Klang Road, Petaling Jaya.

History

During the British colonial period in Malaya, Indians especially the Tamils from Southern India came to Malaya as migrant workers in rubber, tea, coffee and sugar plantations.

Tamil education in Malaysia started when first Tamil primary school was established in Penang in 1816. This school was operational for few years. Later in 1870 more Tamil schools were started in Province Wellesley, North Johor, Negeri Sembilan state.

As the rubber estates grew up in numbers by the end of the nineteenth century, the estate managements and the British government opened more Tamil primary schools. In addition, Christian missionaries in Malaya set up schools as a mean to proselytising Christianity. By 1905, there were 13 government and Christian mission Tamil schools in Malaya.

In the beginning, most of the schools did not last long due to lack of support and commitment from the estate managements and the government, and there was no continuous effort from the Indian community to sustain these schools. To attract more labourers and make them stay longer, the government passed a labour ordinance in 1912 requiring that the estate managements had to set up Tamil schools if there were more than 10 school-going children in the estate. However many estates owners refused to build new buildings for schools, causing the children to study in dilapidated buildings and former smoke houses. Furthermore, the government in those days had not allocated funds to build Tamil schools.

Tamil schools at that time used the school curriculum from India and did not have teaching of the Malay and English languages. Emphasis was given only to reading, writing and arithmetic skills in the lower primary level and writing composition and geography was taught in the higher primary level. The children, on leaving the Tamil primary school, were absorbed into the working milieu of the plantations. Parents themselves, mostly illiterate, did not see the value or purpose of seeking out a secondary education. Furthermore, the colonial government was intending to keep the Indians in the plantations and had no interest in providing education beyond the primary level. As a result, Tamil secondary schools were not established in Malaya.

Between 1930 and 1937, there were some developments in Tamil education when the British Indian government was concerned about the mistreatment of Indian labourers in Malaya. As a result, the Malayan government set up a special committee to provide financial assistance to Tamil schools, appointed inspectors for Tamil schools and also started teachers' training. The number of Tamil schools had also increased tremendously. By 1938, there were 13 government, 511 estate and 23 mission Tamil primary schools in Malaya.

After World War II, the government started to give serious attention to vernacular education by enforcing Education Ordinance 1946. The law emphasised on free mother tongue education and increased the grant provision to Tamil schools. This move paved the way to the increase of students in Tamil schools. Number of students increased gradually from 29,800 in 1946 to 38,700 in 1949. In 1951, the Indian Education Committee reviewed Tamil education and proposed teaching of English in Year 4 and Malay in Year 5.

As Malaya began to move towards self-government and eventual independence, efforts were made to develop a national education policy. The Barnes Report, published in 1951 and enacted as the Education Ordinance of 1952, proposed a national school system with Malay and English as mediums of instruction, with the exclusion of Chinese and Tamil schools, which the Chinese and Indians protested. The Fenn-Wu Report, which allowed the retention of Chinese and Tamil schools, elicited protest from the Malays. In 1956, the Razak Report was published as a compromise; it established a national school system with Malay, English, Chinese and Tamil schools at the primary level, and Malay and English schools at the secondary level. Malay schools would be known as National Schools, and non-Malay schools as National-type schools. The report was accepted and enacted as Education Ordinance of 1956, which formed the basis of the education policy of independent Malaya.

After independence of the Federation of Malaya, Tamil schools accepted government funding and became National-type (Tamil) Schools. Under a set of arrangements, the government is responsible for funding, teachers’ training and setting the school curriculum, while the school buildings and assets remained the property of the local Indian community. Schools under these arrangements elect a board of directors to oversee and safeguard the school properties. However, due to the eventual objective of using Malay as the medium of instruction in all schools as envisioned in the Razak Report, National-Type Schools receive relatively small proportion of education funding compared to the Malay-medium National Schools.

In 2003, the government introduced the policy of teaching Science and Mathematics subjects in English in all schools. This was protested by education groups that advocate the use of mother tongues as mediums of instruction in schools. In 2009, the government announced a return to the previous mediums of instruction starting in 2012. This in turn was met with opposition from parents that support the 2003 policy. In 2011, the government released details of reimplementation of the previous mediums of instruction. While new Year 1 students would be taught in the previous language, students that had already started learning Science and Mathematics in English can choose whether to continue in English or switch to the previous language.

See also
Lists of Tamil national-type primary schools in Malaysia

References

External links
 Yayasan Strategik Sosial

Primary schools in Malaysia
Tamil-language schools in Malaysia